The 1999 Nevada Wolf Pack football team represented the University of Nevada, Reno during the 1999 NCAA Division I-A football season. Nevada competed as a member of the Big West Conference (BWC). The Wolf Pack were led by fourth–year head coach Jeff Tisdel, who resigned after the end of the season. They played their home games at Mackay Stadium.

This was the Wolf Pack's last year as a member of the BWC as they joined the Western Athletic Conference for the 2000 season.

Schedule

References

Nevada
Nevada Wolf Pack football seasons
Nevada Wolf Pack football